Boris Gavrilov may refer to:

Boris Anatolyevich Gavrilov (born 1952), Russian football coach
Boris Petrovich Gavrilov (1944–2006), Soviet rugby union player